The following are the records of Niger in athletics recognized by Fédération Nigérienne d'Athlétisme (FNA).

Outdoor
Key to tables:

h = hand timing

Men

Women

Indoor

Men

Women

Notes

References

External links

Niger
Records
Athletics